Donald Curtis (born Curtis D. Rudolf; February 27, 1915 – May 22, 1997) was an American actor who had roles in dozens of films and television series.

Biography
Curtis was born in Spokane, Washington, the son of Mr. and Mrs. Carl W. Rudolph. Before he began acting in films, he taught at Northwestern University, Allegheny College, and Duquesne University.

Curtis's early acting experience included work at the Pasadena Community Playhouse. He also was in two Broadway plays, Caribbean Carnival (1947) and Anybody Home (1949). In the summer of 1950, Curtis portrayed Adam Conway in the comedy Detective's Wife on CBS television.

Curtis resumed using his birth name when he became a religious leader. As Curtis D. Rudolf, he ministered in the First Church of Religious Science in New York City before he became leader-director of the Church of Religious Science in Philadelphia. He also was pastor of the Church of Religious Science in Santa Barbara, California and the First Church of Religious Science in Dallas, Texas.

Curtis married Margaret Jennings in 1940.

On May 22, 1997, Curtis died in Desert Hot Springs, California.

Filmography

References

External links

 

1915 births
1997 deaths
20th-century American male actors
American male television actors
American male film actors